Alejandro Antonio Durán (born 25 March 1991) is an Argentinian professional racing cyclist, who currently rides for UCI Continental team .

Major results
2011
 3rd Road race, National Junior Road Championships
2015
 1st  Time trial, National Road Championships
 3rd  Time trial, Pan American Road Championships
2016
 6th Time trial, Pan American Road Championships
2017
 5th Time trial, National Road Championships
2018
 3rd Time trial, National Road Championships
2019
 3rd Time trial, National Road Championships
2021
 2nd Time trial, National Road Championships
2022
 1st  Time trial, National Road Championships
 6th Time trial, Pan American Road Championships

References

External links

Living people
1991 births
Argentine male cyclists
People from Mendoza Province
Cyclists at the 2015 Pan American Games
Pan American Games competitors for Argentina